Waldo Vieira (April 12, 1932 – July 2, 2015) was a Brazilian spiritual author, medium, physician and dentist who founded the spiritual movements of Conscientiology and Projectiology.

Biography
He became a Spiritist when young and graduated in medicine and dentistry. In 1955, he met the famous Brazilian medium Chico Xavier and the two co-authored several books on Spiritism, founded their Spiritist centre, practiced philanthropy and did voluntary medium work, including psychographies. Around 1966, he became a dissident Spiritist, developing his own views on the subject and stopping to work with Xavier. He then began studying themes related to parapsychology, like astral projections and altered states of consciousness. He became a member of the American Society for Psychical Research and the Society for Psychical Research, founding two fields of study he termed Conscienciologia ("Conscientiology") and Projeciologia ("Projectiology"). He published his first book on the subject in 1979, with several other publications until his death in 2015. His books were translated into English, Spanish, Italian, German and Chinese.

References

1932 births
2015 deaths
Brazilian spiritual writers
Brazilian spiritual mediums
Near-death experiences
Parapsychologists
Self-help writers